Pickering Town Centre (PTC) is a large regional shopping mall located in Pickering, Ontario, Canada. Opened in 1972 as Pickering Sheridan Mall, the mall has over 150 stores.

History
The mall opened in 1972 as the Sheridan Mall with 80 stores. Its first significant renovations were in 1998.

The PTC underwent a $17 million renovation through 2008 and 2009. This included new floors, ceilings, lighting and seating areas. It has a modern look and features an additional elevator.

On the morning of November 28, 2016, the Pickering Town Centre was flooded with water, causing the closure of the majority of the lower-level stores and Santa's Castle. The cause of the flooding was due to a broken water main. Most stores had reopened by December 1, 2016. 

Following the closure of Target Canada in 2015, in 2017, the former Target store at the mall was replaced by three new stores, a Saks Off 5th outlet store, Cineplex Cinemas 11 and VIP movie theatre and a Farm Boy food market. In 2018 new stores were added, such as Winners/HomeSense and an Hakim Optical store. There are also redevelopment plans for the former Famous Players movie theatre and a Sears department store (under demolition to be replaced by condos) at the mall.

Anchors
 Hudson's Bay
 Winners/HomeSense (opened 2018, formerly Sport Chek)
 H&M
 Shoppers Drug Mart
 Saks Fifth Avenue Off 5th (opened 2017, formerly Target)
 Farm Boy (opened 2017, formerly Target)
 Cineplex Cinemas (opened 2018, formerly Target)

Former anchors
 Kmart (closed 1998, now Saks/Farm Boy/Cineplex)
 Eaton's (closed 1999, now Hudson's Bay)
 Zellers (closed 2012, now Saks/Farm Boy/Cineplex)
 Target (closed 2015, now Saks/Farm Boy/Cineplex)
 Famous Players (closed 2018, replaced by Cineplex Cinemas as the main theatre, former location now vacant)
 Sport Chek (closed 2018, now Winners/HomeSense)
 Sears (closed 2018, became Designer Depot for a short time, now demolished)
 Designer Depot (was in Sears' former location for a short time, closed in 2020 and demolished)

References

External links
Official website

Shopping malls in Ontario
Shopping malls established in 1972
Pickering, Ontario
Buildings and structures in the Regional Municipality of Durham
Tourist attractions in the Regional Municipality of Durham